The year 2021 is the 11th year in the history of the Fight Nights, a mixed martial arts promotion based in Russia. The company continues broadcasts through Match TV and Fight Network.

List of events

AMC Fight Nights: Steel Heart XI

'AMC Fight Nights Global: Steel Heart XI' was a mixed martial arts event held by AMC Fight Nights January 22, 2021 at the Arena Metallurg in Magnitogorsk, Russia.

Background
The event was headlined by a Fight Nights Light Heavyweight title fight between Armen Petrosyan and Dmitry Minakov, while the co-main event was contested between Anatoly Kondratiev and Moris Boleyan for the flyweight title.

Kuat Khamitov was scheduled to fight Magomed Magomedov in a lightweight bout. Magomedov later withdrew from the fight, and was replaced by Alexey Ilyenko.

In the sole women's fight of the card, Viktoriya Khodko faced the debuting Sofiya Shvyreva at featherweight.

Results

AMC Fight Nights:  Sochi

'AMC Fight Nights:  Sochi' was a mixed martial arts event held by AMC Fight Nights February 23, 2021 at the WOW Arena in Sochi, Russia.

Background
The event was headlined by a welterweight bout between the former Bellator Welterweight champion Andrey Koreshkov and the former Shooto Brazil Middleweight champion Adriano Rodrigues.

In the co-main event, Vladimir Egoyan and Sharamazan Chupanov were scheduled to fight for the vacant AMC Fight Nights Bantamweight Championship.

The event also featured the return of the former PRIDE openweight Zuluzinho, who was scheduled to fight the undefeated heavyweight Yusup Shuaev.

Results

AMC Fight Nights: Vladimir Voronov Memory Tournament

'AMC Fight Nights: Vladimir Voronov Memory Tournament' was a mixed martial arts event held by AMC Fight Nights March 16, 2021 at The world concert hall in Moscow, Russia.

Background
The event was headlined by a welterweight bout between Alexey Makhno and the 60-fight veteran Vaso Bakočević.

Results

AMC Fight Nights 100

'AMC Fight Nights 100' was a mixed martial arts event held by AMC Fight Nights on April 10, 2021, in Moscow, Russia.

Background
This event featured two title fights, first the reigning AMC Fight Nights Welterweight Champion Dmitry Bikrev made his second title defense against Goity Dazaev as the event headliner. And in the co-main event, a bout for the AMC Fight Nights Lightweight Championship between the reigning champ Nariman Abbasov and top contender Shamil Amirov.

Results

AMC Fight Nights 101: Primorsky Krai Governor's Cup

'AMC Fight Nights 101: Primorsky Krai Governor's Cup' was a mixed martial arts event held by AMC Fight Nights on May 7, 2021, at the Fetisov Arena in Vladivostok, Russia.

Background
The event featured a middleweight bout that saw Alexander Shlemenko return after seventeen months layoff to headline AMC Fight Nights 101.

Results

AMC Fight Nights 102

'AMC Fight Nights 102' was a mixed martial arts event held by AMC Fight Nights on June 4, 2021, in Krasnoyarsk, Russia.

Background
A light-heavyweight title bout contested by the reigning champion Armen Petrosyan and Hasan Yousefi served as the event headliner.

A middleweight bout between David Barkhudaryan and the former M-1 Global Light Heavyweight champion Vyacheslav Vasilevsky was announced as the co-main event.

Results

AMC Fight Nights 103

AMC Fight Nights 103 was a mixed martial arts event held by AMC Fight Nights on July 15, 2021, in Sochi, Russia.

Background
The event was headlined by a welterweight bout between the former ACB featherweight champion Yusuf Raisov and Alexey Makhno.

Moris Boleyan was scheduled to make his first AMC flyweight title defense against the undefeated Azizkhan Chorshanbiev.

Results

AMC Fight Nights: Abdulmanap Nurmagomedov Memory Tournament

'AMC Fight Nights: Abdulmanap Nurmagomedov Memory Tournament' was a mixed martial arts event held by Fight Nights Global in association with Eagle Fighting Championship on September 17, 2021, at Crocus Expo Arena in Moscow, Russia.

Background
The main event featured an AMC lightweight championship bout between the reigning champion Nariman Abbasov and the contender Shamil Zavurov. The bout was the last of Zavurov.

Results

AMC Fight Nights 104

AMC Fight Nights 104 was a mixed martial arts event held by AMC Fight Nights on September 24, 2021, at the WOW Arena in Sochi, Russia.

Background
The main event featured a catchweight bout between Marif Piraev and Kuat Khamitov.

Results

AMC Fight Nights 105

AMC Fight Nights 105 was a mixed martial arts event held by AMC Fight Nights on October 16, 2021, at the WOW Arena in Sochi, Russia.

Background
A middleweight title bout between the champion Vladimir Mineev and title challenger Magomed Ismailov served as the event headliner.

Results

AMC Fight Nights 106

AMC Fight Nights 106 was a mixed martial arts event held by AMC Fight Nights on November 27, 2021, in Syktyvkar, Russia.

Background
A middleweight bout between Vyacheslav Vasilevsky and Márcio Santos was slated to serve as the event headliner. However, the Russian was have to withdraw for this event due to illness. On November 18, it is announced that Santos will fought against Alexander Emelianenko.

Results

AMC Fight Nights 107

AMC Fight Nights 107 was a mixed martial arts event held by AMC Fight Nights on December 20, 2021, in Minsk, Belarus.

Background

Results

See also
2021 in UFC
2021 in Bellator MMA
2021 in ONE Championship
2021 in Rizin Fighting Federation
2021 in Konfrontacja Sztuk Walki
2021 in Absolute Championship Akhmat
2021 in Legacy Fighting Alliance

References

Fight Nights Global events
2021 in mixed martial arts
AMC Fight Nights
2021 sport-related lists